Lucija Mori (born 31 January 1988) is a Slovenian international football goalkeeper currently playing for Soccer Women Carinthians in the Austrian league. She has also played in her country and for Serie A's ACF Brescia.

She has been the first choice goalkeeper in the Slovenian national team since the 2011 World Cup qualification

References

1988 births
Living people
Slovenian women's footballers
Slovenia women's international footballers
Slovenian expatriate footballers
Expatriate women's footballers in Austria
Expatriate women's footballers in Italy
Serie A (women's football) players
Slovenian expatriate sportspeople in Austria
Slovenian expatriate sportspeople in Italy
People from Dravograd
Women's association football goalkeepers
A.C.F. Brescia Calcio Femminile players
ŽNK Mura players